Triumph Township may refer to one of the following places in the United States:

 Triumph Township, Custer County, Nebraska
 Triumph Township, Ramsey County, North Dakota
 Triumph Township, Warren County, Pennsylvania

See also

Triumph (disambiguation)

Township name disambiguation pages